"Night Light" is a song by British singer Jessie Ware from her debut studio album, Devotion. The song was released in the United Kingdom as a digital download on 25 September 2012. The song was written by Jessie Ware, Kid Harpoon and Dave Okumu. The song peaked at number 95 on the UK Singles Chart.

Music video
A music video to accompany the release of "Night Light" was first released onto YouTube on 18 September 2012 at a total length of four minutes and thirteen seconds.

Track listing

Credits and personnel
 Lead vocals – Jessie Ware
 Producers – Dave Okumu
 Engineers – Dan Vinci
 Lyrics – Jessie Ware, Kid Harpoon, Dave Okumu
 Label – Island

Chart performance

Release history

References

2012 singles
2012 songs
Jessie Ware songs
Island Records singles
Songs written by Kid Harpoon
Songs written by Jessie Ware